Guy Van Sam (born 20 December 1935) is a French former footballer who played as a striker for the France national team.

Personal life
Van Sam was born in Beirut on 20 December 1935, to an Indochinese father and a Lebanese mother.

References

Bibliography

External links
 
 

1935 births
Living people
Footballers from Beirut
French people of Lebanese descent
Sportspeople of Lebanese descent
French footballers
Association football forwards
France international footballers
Montpellier HSC players
Racing Club de France Football players
SC Toulon players
Ligue 1 players
Ligue 2 players